Trakai (see names section for alternative and historic names) is a historic town and lake resort in Lithuania. Because of its proximity to Vilnius, Trakai is a popular tourist destination. Trakai is the administrative centre of Trakai district municipality. The town is inhabited by 5,357 people, according to 2007 estimates. A notable feature of Trakai is that the town was built and preserved by people of different nationalities. Historically, communities of Karaims, Tatars, Lithuanians, Russians, Jews and Poles lived here.

Names and etymology

The name of the town was first recorded in chronicles from 1337 in German as Tracken (later also spelt Traken) and is derived from the Lithuanian word trakai (singular: trakas meaning "glade"). Since the time of the Polish–Lithuanian Commonwealth, the city has been known as Troki in Polish. Its other alternate names include Тро́кі (Tróki, historic)/Трака́й (Trakáj, modern Belarusian), Trok (Yiddish), Troky, and Traki. The name is the origin of the surname Trotsky (lit: of Traki), which Leon Trotsky would later adopt as a pseudonym to avoid profiling by the Russian Imperial Police, the Polish variant of the surname is Trocki.

Demographics
The majority of Trakai's inhabitants (66.5%) are Lithuanian, although the town also has a substantial Polish minority (19%), as well as Russians (8.87%).

Geography

There are 200 lakes in the region, of which the deepest (46.7 m) is Galvė with its 21 islands. Galvė covers an area of 3.88 km2, Vilkokšnis lake – 3.37 km2, the lake of Skaistis – 2.96 km2. There are Trakai Historical National Park and Aukštadvaris Regional Park founded in the territory of the region.

Trakai Historical National Park was founded on 23 April 1991 to preserve Trakai as a centre of Lithuanian statehood as well as the park's authentic nature. The territory of the park covers 82 km2, 34 km2 of which are covered by forests, and 130 km2 are covered by lakes.

Aukštadvaris Regional Park was founded in 1992 to preserve the valuable landscapes of Verknė and Strėva upper reaches. The area of the park is 153.5 km2, most of which is covered by forests. There are 72 lakes here, the biggest of which is Vilkokšnis.

Trakai is a town built on water. The town is surrounded by the lakes of Luka (Bernardinai), Totoriškės, Galvė, Akmena, Gilušis. There are a number of architectural, cultural and historical monuments in Trakai. The history museum in the castle was established in 1962. Festivals and concerts take place in the island castle in summer.

History

Beginnings
The first settlements in this area appeared as early as the first millennium A.D. The town, as well as its surroundings, started developing in the 13th century in the place of Senieji Trakai (Old Trakai). According to a legend after a successful hunting party, Grand Duke Gediminas discovered a beautiful lake-surrounded place not far from Kernavė, then capital of the Grand Duchy of Lithuania, and decided to build a castle in the location. That is how the Old Trakai Castle was built in Senieji Trakai. The name of Trakai was first mentioned in Teutonic Knights chronicles in 1337. This year is considered to be the official date of town's foundation. When Grand Duke Gediminas finally settled in Vilnius, Senieji Trakai was inherited by his son Kęstutis. Duchy of Trakai developed and the town entered its best decades.

Golden age

Kęstutis moved the town from Senieji Trakai to its current location, which is sometimes known as Naujieji Trakai. The new location was a place of intensive construction: a new castle was built in the strait between lakes Galvė and Luka and known as the Peninsula Castle, and another one, known as the Island Castle, on an island in Lake Galvė. A village grew around the castles. Vicinity of Trakai was protected by Senieji Trakai, Strėva, Bražuolė, Daniliškės and other hillforts from attacks of the Teutonic Knights. Despite the protection, both wooden castles were successfully raided by the Teutonic Knights several times in a row.

The town was in the center of a conflict between Grand Duke Jogaila (later to become King of Poland) with his uncle Kęstutis. In 1382 Jogaila's and Kęstutis's armies met near Trakai, but Jogaila tricked Kęstutis and imprisoned him in Kreva. A few weeks later Kęstutis died in captivity and Jogaila transferred the castles to his brother Skirgaila, who became the governor of Lithuania Proper. However, his rule was briefly interrupted when in 1383 joint forces of Kęstutis's son Vytautas and the Teutonic Knights captured the town. In 1392, Vytautas and Jogaila signed the Astrava Agreement ending their quarrel. Vytautas became the Grand Duke of Lithuania while Jogaila technically remained his superior. Vytautas also regained his father's lands, including Trakai. Despite his official capital being in Vilnius, Vytautas spent more time in Trakai. In early 15th century he replaced the older, wooden fortress with a stone-built castle. Some design elements were borrowed from the castles of the Teutonic Knights as Vytautas spent some time with the Teutons forming an alliance against Jogaila in earlier years.

Trakai became a political and an administrative centre of the Duchy, sometimes named a de facto capital of Lithuania. Construction of the brick castles was finished and a Catholic church was built. In 1409, the town was granted with Magdeburg Rights; it is one of the first towns in Lithuania to get city rights. The village started rapidly developing into a town. In 1413, it became a seat of the Trakai Voivodeship and a notable center of administration and commerce.

Decline and reconstruction

After the Grand Duchy of Lithuania joined the Kingdom of Poland to form the Polish–Lithuanian Commonwealth in 1569, the castles remained a royal property, but the town's importance gradually declined, with the nearby Vilnius and the political center of the Commonwealth in Kraków being far more important. Nevertheless, it continued to be the seat of local Sejmik. In Polish sources the town name was started to be referred to as Troki. In 1477, the castle on the lake was a meeting place of King Casimir IV with Venetian envoys. After that the castle became a luxurious prison for political prisoners. Sigismund I the Old imprisoned the members of Goštautai family, believed to be conspiring with Michael Glinski. Also Helena, widow of King Alexander was kept there in order to prevent her escape to the Grand Duchy of Moscow. The castle was refurbished by King Sigismund I the Old, who set up his summer residence there; however, after his death in 1548 the castle gradually fell into disrepair.

During the wars between Russia and Poland between 1654 and 1667, the town was plundered and burnt. In the aftermath of the war with the Tsardom of Russia in 1655, both castles were demolished and the town's prosperity ended. The castle ruins remained a historical landmark. During the Great Northern War (1700–1721) Trakai was plundered again, as famine and plague swept the country.

After the Partitions of Poland in 1795, the area was annexed by the Russian Empire. After World War I, the area became part of the restored Republic of Poland. In 1929, the Polish authorities ordered reconstruction and restoration of the Trakai Island Castle. The works in the Upper castle were almost complete in 1939, when the Invasion of Poland started and the area was soon annexed by the Soviet Union, then by Nazi Germany during Operation Barbarossa. During the war, more than 5,000 Jews from the Trakai region were murdered by the Nazis. In 1944, during Operation Tempest, the town was liberated by joint forces of the underground Polish Home Army and Soviet partisans. After World War II it was again annexed by the Soviet Union and made part of the Lithuanian SSR in the Soviet Union; subsequently many of the city's and area's ethnic Polish inhabitants left for the recovered Territories of the Polish People's Republic.

In 1961, the reconstruction of the upper castle and a high tower construction were completed; however, the works came to a halt as a result of Nikita Khrushchev's speech of 21 December 1960, where the First Secretary declared that reconstruction of the castle would be a sign of glorification of Lithuania's feudal past. Works in the lower castle were not resumed until the 1980s and were completed by the Lithuanian authorities in the early 1990s. Today the Island Castle serves as the main tourist attraction, hosting various cultural events such as operas and concerts.

Karaim community

Karaims (or Karaites) are a small Turkic-speaking religious and Jewish ethnic group resettled to Trakai by Grand Duke Vytautas in 1397 and 1398 from Crimea, after one of his successful military campaigns against the Golden Horde. Both Christian and Karaim communities were granted separate self-government in accordance with the Magdeburg rights. Despite ever-increasing Polonisation, Trakai remained a notable center of Karaim cultural and religious life. Some famous scholars were active in Trakai in the 16th and 17th centuries, such as Isaac of Troki (c. 1533 – c. 1594), Joseph ben Mordechai Malinowski, Zera ben Nathan of Trakai, Salomon ben Aharon of Trakai, Ezra ben Nissan (died in 1666) and Josiah ben Judah (died after 1658). Some of the Karaims became wealthy and noble.

The local Karaim community, the backbone of the town's economy, suffered severely during the Khmelnytsky Uprising and the massacres of 1648. By 1680, only 30 Karaim families were left in the town. Their traditions, including not accepting neophytes, prevented the community from regaining its strength. Early in the 18th century war, famine, and plague reduced the Karaims to three families. By 1765 Karaim community increased to 300. Trakai's Karaim kenesa is a rare example of a surviving wooden synagogue with an interior dome. Kibinai, traditional Karaim pastry, became a local speciality and are mentioned in tourist guides.

Twin towns – sister cities

Trakai is twinned with:

 Acre, Israel
 Alanya, Turkey
 Avola, Italy
 Giżycko, Poland
 Giżycko (rural gmina), Poland
 Ivano-Frankivsk, Ukraine
 Koszalin, Poland
 Lutsk, Ukraine
 Malbork, Poland
 Mtskheta, Georgia
 Nowy Sącz, Poland
 Qazax, Azerbaijan
 Rheine, Germany
 Schönebeck, Germany
 Västra Götaland County, Sweden

Notable people
 Isaac of Troki
 Vladimir Belsky (1866-1946), poet and librettist

See also

References

External links

 Trakai Town Site
 Trakai Historical National Park

 
Cities in Lithuania
Resorts in Lithuania
Cities in Vilnius County
Trakai Voivodeship
Troksky Uyezd
Wilno Voivodeship (1926–1939)
Municipalities administrative centres of Lithuania
Magdeburg rights
Articles containing video clips
Holocaust locations in Lithuania